Pulin Khatik Road is a famous thoroughfare in the city of Kolkata (formerly Calcutta), India. It is 650 metre in length from Radhanath Chowdhuri Road (Pottery Road) to Chingrihata Lane (New Tangra Road) in the Tangra area. The road crosses Gobinda Chandra Khatik Road at Tara Jewellers.

See also
 Streets in Kolkata

References

Streets in Kolkata
Tourist attractions in Kolkata
Shopping districts and streets in India